Brea Hill (meaning hill), pronounced "Bray Hill" is a round hill beside the River Camel estuary in north Cornwall, England, United Kingdom The hill is  high and there are Bronze Age tumuli (burial mounds) at the summit. The underlying geology in this area of Cornwall is Devonian slates.

Brea Hill is situated at the south end of Daymer Bay between the settlements of Trebetherick and Rock in the civil parish of St Minver Lowlands. approximately five miles northwest of Wadebridge

On the west side, Brea Hill rises straight from the foreshore; on the north and south it rises from low sand dunes. To the east, the dunes give way to a golf course and grassland with St Enodoc's Church (where the poet Sir John Betjeman is buried) just below the hill.

The South West Coast Path follows the west flank of the hill with an alternative route passing to the east. Brea Hill is grassed and treeless (except for a small wooded area low on the south flank) with rough footpaths leading to the summit and burial mounds.

Literary associations
Brea Hill features in the John Betjeman poem 'Back from Australia', where Betjeman uses the alternative spelling Bray Hill (Stepper is Stepper Point):

At home in Cornwall hurrying autumn skies
Leave Bray Hill barren, Stepper jutting bare,
And hold the moon above the sea-wet sand.
The very last of late September dies
In frosty silence and the hills declare
How vast the sky is, looked at from the land.

References

Hills of Cornwall
Geology of Cornwall
Cornish Killas